Industrial Strength may refer to:
 Industrial strength
 Industrial Strength, potato chips produced by Dakota Style
 Industrial Strength (album), a 1983 album by Borbetomagus